The Waltham Gas and Electric Company Generating Plant is a historic power company generator building at 96 Pine Street in Waltham, Massachusetts.  Built c. 1900–1909, this large concrete-and-stone building is an essentially unaltered early power generation plant, although all of its window openings have been filled with concrete.  It originally housed a steam power generator, and was sold by Waltham Gas and Electric to Boston Edison, who converted it to an electrical substation in 1917, a role it continues to fulfill.

The building was listed on the National Register of Historic Places in 1989.

See also
National Register of Historic Places listings in Waltham, Massachusetts

References

Industrial buildings and structures on the National Register of Historic Places in Massachusetts
Buildings and structures in Waltham, Massachusetts
National Register of Historic Places in Waltham, Massachusetts